Joice Takaidza also spelled as Joyce Takaidza (born 10 December 1983) is a Zimbabwean netball player who represents Zimbabwe internationally and plays in the positions of goal attack and goal defense. She was a member of the Zimbabwean squad which finished at eighth position during the 2019 Netball World Cup, which was historically Zimbabwe's first ever appearance at a Netball World Cup tournament. During the tournament, she was the leading point scorer for Zimbabwe finishing with 198 points in 7 matches.

References 

1983 births
Living people
Zimbabwean netball players
Zimbabwean emigrants to Australia
2019 Netball World Cup players